"Flagpole Sitta" is a song by American rock band Harvey Danger from their 1997 debut album, Where Have All the Merrymakers Gone?. It was released as the band's debut single in April 1998 and was met with critical and commercial success, peaking at number 38 on the US Billboard Hot 100 Airplay chart, number three on the Billboard Modern Rock Tracks chart, and number nine on the Canadian RPM Alternative 30.

Composition
"Flagpole Sitta" was recorded in June 1996 at John and Stu's Place in Seattle, Washington, during the Where Have All the Merrymakers Gone? recording sessions. According to drummer Evan Sult, the song was written as a response to the Seattle music scene of the 1990s and its effect on mainstream culture.

The title of the song was inspired by the 1930 Marx Brothers film Animal Crackers, which features a line of dialogue about the pole sitting fad of the 1920s. The band was inspired to spell "sitter" as "sitta" by the Pavement song "Fame Throwa" and the N.W.A album Straight Outta Compton.

Release and reception
"Flagpole Sitta" gained popularity after Seattle radio station KNDD put the song into rotation. Afterwards, London Records sent a copy of Where Have All the Merrymakers Gone? to KROQ-FM in Los Angeles, who began to air "Flagpole Sitta" and received a positive response from listeners. On April 27, 1998, the song was officially serviced to US rock radio, and a release to contemporary hit radio followed on June 9 of the same year. The song gained further exposure when it was used as the music in theatrical trailers and TV spots for the 1998 film Disturbing Behavior. The track subsequently charted at number 38 on the Billboard Hot 100 Airplay chart. A music video was produced to promote the single. The song is regarded as a power pop single by MTV and a post-grunge anthem by author Ericka Chickowski. PopMatters describes the single as "a hyper-literate Alternative rock dissection of the stupidity of the modern age". Music journalist Rob Sheffield also considers the song as "nineties pop-punk rage at its loudest".

Track listings

Charts

Release history

Legacy
"Flagpole Sitta" was used as the theme song for the British sitcom Peep Show for the second series through the ninth. In 2008, Harvey Danger singer Sean Nelson stated that Peep Show is "...the only pop culture item the song has been associated with that feels like a kindred spirit to the original attitude of the lyric." In 2016, he said: "It’s a joy to be affiliated with something that’s so smart and so funny and so kind of rude and weird." Rolling Stone ranked the song the 25th best of the 1990s. The song was included on the soundtrack to Scooby-Doo 2: Monsters Unleashed''.

References

External links
 
 
 

1996 songs
1998 debut singles
Harvey Danger songs
London Records singles
Music videos directed by Liz Friedlander
Slash Records singles
Comedy television theme songs